The 1982 UCLA Bruins football team was an American football team that represented the University of California, Los Angeles during the 1982 NCAA Division I-A football season.  In their seventh year under head coach Terry Donahue, the Bruins compiled a 10–1–1 record (5–1–1 Pac-10), finished in first place in the Pacific-10 Conference.

In the Rose Bowl on New Year's Day, the Bruins defeated Michigan of the Big Ten Conference by ten points and remained at fifth in the final AP Poll.

UCLA's offensive leaders in 1982 were quarterback Tom Ramsey with 2,986 passing yards, running back Danny Andrews with 482 rushing yards, and wide receiver Cormac Carney with 779 receiving yards.

Prior to this season, UCLA moved its home games to the Rose Bowl in Pasadena; they had played in the Los Angeles Memorial Coliseum since 1928, sharing with the USC Trojans.

Schedule

Personnel

Game summaries

Long Beach State

JoJo Townsell 5 Rec, 133 Yds

at Wisconsin

    
    
    
    
    
    
    
    
    
    
    
    

Tom Ramsey completed 17 of 24 passes for 260 yards and rushed 17 times for 56 yards in the game.

at Michigan

Down 21–0 in the second quarter, Tom Ramsey mounted a 28-point comeback in the second and third quarters to defeat the 20th ranked Michigan team before a capacity crowd of 105,413 fans in Michigan Stadium.

Colorado
Cormac Carney 6 Rec, 103 Yds

Arizona

Tom Ramsey 345 pass yards

California
Tom Ramsey 322 pass yards 
Cormac Carney 4 Rec, 132 Yds

Stanford
Tom Ramsey 314 pass yards 
Danny Andrews 21 rushes, 148 yards
Cormac Carney 6 receptions, 137 yards

USC

Noseguard Karl Morgan rushed in to tackle down USC quarterback Scott Tinsley, preventing him from scoring a two-pont conversion after Tinsley had thrown a pass to bring the Trojans back within a point. Linebacker Neal Dellocono was the most valuable player of the game.

With the win (and Washington's loss), UCLA clinched a Rose Bowl berth.

vs. Michigan (Rose Bowl)

UCLA took a 10–0 lead in the second quarter. A hard hit by UCLA defensive back Don Rogers separated Michigan quarterback Steve Smith's shoulder and knocked him out of the game. Backup David Hall got the Wolverines on the board, making the halftime score 10–7. In the third quarter, Tom Ramsey completed seven straight passes and led UCLA on a drive that was capped by Danny Andrews' nine-yard touchdown run to make the score 17–7. In the fourth quarter, UCLA got an interception inside the Michigan 20-yard line and scored again for a 24–7 lead. Michigan scored late to close the score to 24–14.

1983 NFL Draft
The following players were drafted into professional football following the season.

References

UCLA
UCLA Bruins football seasons
Pac-12 Conference football champion seasons
Rose Bowl champion seasons
UCLA Bruins football